The Gang's All Here may refer to:

Film and TV
 The Gang's All Here (1939 film), a 1939 British film starring Googie Withers
 The Gang's All Here (1941 film), a 1941 American film starring Frankie Darro, Marcia Mae Jones, and  Jackie Moran
 The Gang's All Here (1943 film), a 1943 American film directed by Busby Berkeley and starring Alice Faye and Carmen Miranda
"The Gang's All Here", a 1984 episode of the animated TV series Alvin and the Chipmunks
"The Gang's All Here" (Pee-wee's Playhouse), a 1986 episode of the children's TV series Pee-wee's Playhouse
 "The Gang's All Here", an episode of the 1987 TV series Teenage Mutant Ninja Turtles

Music
 The Gang's All Here (Dropkick Murphys album), 1999
 The Gang's All Here (Skid Row album), 2022
"Hail, Hail, the Gang's All Here", a traditional song

Books and plays
 The Gang's All Here (play), 1959 play by Jerome Lawrence and Robert Edwin Lee
Hail, Hail, the Gang's All Here, a 1971 87th Precinct novel by Ed McBain